The 27th World Science Fiction Convention (Worldcon), also known as St. Louiscon, was held on 28 August–1 September 1969 at the Chase Park Plaza Hotel in St. Louis, Missouri, United States.

The chairpersons were Ray Fisher and Joyce Fisher. The supporting organization was OSFA, the Ozark Science Fiction Association.

Participants 

Attendance was 1,534, out of over 2,000 paid memberships.

Guests of Honor 

 Jack Gaughan (pro)
 Eddie Jones (fan artist); also as the TAFF winner, replaced Ted White
 Harlan Ellison (toastmaster)

Awards

1969 Hugo Awards 

 Best Novel: Stand on Zanzibar by John Brunner
 Best Novella: "Nightwings" by Robert Silverberg
 Best Novelette: "The Sharing of Flesh" by Poul Anderson
 Best Short Story: "The Beast that Shouted Love at the Heart of the World" by Harlan Ellison
 Best Dramatic Presentation: 2001: A Space Odyssey
 Best Professional Artist: Jack Gaughan
 Best Professional Magazine: Fantasy & Science Fiction
 Best Fanzine: Science Fiction Review, edited by Richard E. Geis
 Best Fan Artist: Vaughn Bodé
 Best Fan Writer: Harry Warner, Jr.

Other awards 

 Special Award: Neil Armstrong, Edwin Aldrin, and Michael Collins for "The Best Moon Landing Ever"

See also 

 Hugo Award
 Science fiction
 Speculative fiction
 World Science Fiction Society
 Worldcon

References

External links 

 NESFA.org: The Long List
 NESFA.org: 1969 convention notes 
 Hugo.org: 1969 Hugo Awards

1969 conferences
1969 in Missouri
1969 in the United States
Science fiction conventions in the United States
Worldcon